Los Angeles City Council District 10 is one of the 15 districts of the Los Angeles City Council.

It is located in southern Central Los Angeles and northern South Los Angeles. Heather Hutt has been councilmember since 2022 after Herb Wesson, who previously served from 2005 to 2020 and in 2022, was barred from council duties.

Geography

Present district 

The district's website lists 52 neighborhoods within the 10th District. They are: 

 Alsace Avenue
 Angelus Vista
 Arlington Heights
 Avenues of Washington
 Baldwin Village
 Baldwin Vista
 Baldwin Hills Village Garden
 Cameo Woods
 CHAPS
 Cherrywood
 Country Club Park
 Crenshaw Manor
 Faircrest Heights
 Gramercy Park
 Harvard Heights
 Harvard Heights North
 Historic Leimert Park Village
 JBAC
 Jefferson Park
 Kinney Heights
 Koreatown
 La Cienega Heights
 Lafayette Square
 Leimert Park
 Little Bangladesh
 Little Ethiopia
 Longwood
 Marvin/Carmona/Curson
 Mid-City
 Olympic Park
 Oxford Square
 Picfair Village
 Pico Park
 Queen Anne
 Regent Square
 Reynier Village
 Smiley/Hauser
 SODA
 South Robertson
 Spaulding/Thurman/Genesee
 West Adams Heights Sugar Hill
 Veronica/Sanchez/Sycamore
 Victoria Park
 Village Green
 Wellington Square
 West Adams Avenues
 Western Heights
 Wilshire Center
 Wilshire Vista Heights
 Wilshire Vista

For entire geographic area represented by the district, see the official  City of Los Angeles map of District 10.

Historical boundaries

The district has occupied the same general area since it was formed in 1925. With the city's changes in population, though,  its western boundary has moved farther west and its southern boundary farther south. In 1961, San Fernando Valley residents for a time backed an unsuccessful plan to move the 10th District seat to the Valley after it was left vacant with the resignation of Council Member Charles Navarro.

The rough boundaries or descriptions have been as follows:

1925: North, Pico Boulevard or 11th Street; south, Washington Boulevard and Jefferson Boulevard; east, Alameda Street; west, Vermont Avenue.

1926: North, Pico Boulevard; south, Jefferson Boulevard; east, Central Avenue; west, Vermont Avenue.

1932–33: North, Pico Boulevard; south, Jefferson Boulevard and Exposition Boulevard; east, Hooper Avenue (two blocks west of Alameda); west, Vermont Avenue.

1955: In the "south-central section of the city, extending roughly from Wilshire Blvd. to Jefferson Blvd., and from La Brea Ave. to Main St."

1960: Baldwin Hills was shifted from the 10th District to the 6th District.

1961: Covers "the general area known as the West Adams section."

1973: Includes "parts of the Leimert Park, Crenshaw, Wilshire, West Adams, and Fairfax areas."

1975: From "Olympic Blvd. on the north, to La Cienega Blvd. and Cattaraugus Ave. on the west, to Rodeo Road and Jefferson and Adams Blvds. on the south, to the Harbor Freeway on the east."

1986: Los Angeles Times map shows district reaching Beverly Boulevard on the northeast, Martin Luther King Jr. Boulevard on the south, Sepulveda Boulevard on the west and Wilshire Boulevard on the north.

1993: Stretches "from Palms to Koreatown and South Los Angeles."

2020: From Koreatown to Crenshaw Boulevard, including West Adams and Mid-City.

Officeholders
Fourteen people have represented this district.

See also
Los Angeles City Council districts
Los Angeles City Council

References

Note: Access to some of the Los Angeles Times links may require the use of a Los Angeles Public Library card.

External links
 Official Los Angeles City Council District 10 website
  City of Los Angeles: Map of District 10

Los Angeles City Council districts
LACD10
LACD10
Koreatown, Los Angeles
Mid-City, Los Angeles
West Adams, Los Angeles
Wilshire, Los Angeles